Niko Mindegía Elizaga (born 19 July 1988) is a Spanish handball player who plays for Wisła Płock and the Spanish national team.

He competed at the 2016 European Men's Handball Championship.

References

1988 births
Living people
Spanish male handball players
Expatriate handball players in Poland
Spanish expatriate sportspeople in Hungary
Spanish expatriate sportspeople in France
Spanish expatriate sportspeople in Denmark
Spanish expatriate sportspeople in Poland
SC Pick Szeged players
Wisła Płock (handball) players
Handball players from Navarre